Joseph W. Kable is a psychologist at the University of Pennsylvania.

Joseph Kable is the Baird Term Associate Professor of Psychology in the School of Arts and Sciences at the University of Pennsylvania. 

Kable researches cognitive neuroscience. His work has suggested that an individual's approach to risk in decision making is correlated with the anatomical structure of the brain. Another of Kable's projects concluded that "Brain Training" using Lumosity software “appears to have no benefits in healthy young adults above those of standard video games.” Kable's team used functional magnetic resonance imaging (fMRI) to measure brain activation in the participants while they were performing executive function tasks. The measurements revealed no difference in brain activity between the Lumosity and control groups.

References

Selected bibliography
 
 

American cognitive neuroscientists
University of Pennsylvania faculty
Neuroimaging researchers